Truls Johannessen Wiel Graff (16 April 1851 – 1918) was a Norwegian county governor.

He was the youngest living son of captain Christian Fredrik Graff (1818–1893) and Cathrine Magdalene Bull Wiel. In 1882 he married Benta Tomine Marie Cathrine Baastad. Their son Ragnvald Graff became a major and barrister.

In 1890 he was the acting County Governor of Hedmark, and from 1896 to 1906 he served as the County Governor of Finnmark.

References

1851 births
1918 deaths
County governors of Norway